Adolf Ditlev Jørgensen (11 June 1840 – 5 October 1897) was a Danish historian and National Archivist.

Biography
He was born  at Gråsten in the Duchy of Schleswig. He attended Flensborg lærde Skole in Flensburg (1853-1857). He entered Flensborg  Latinskole and
graduated with distinction in 1859. In 1863, Jørgensen was employed as a high school teacher at Flensburg  Alten Gymnasium.   In 1864 he went to Copenhagen where  from  1869 he was an assistant in the Danish archives and from   1874   deputy clerk.  Jorgensen became National Archivist from 1883. He took over the management of the Danish National Archives and  carried out a modernization including the establishment of three provincial archives.

He was a member of the Royal Danish Academy of Sciences and Letters from 1883 and from  1894 was commander 2nd degree of the Order of the Dannebrog.

Selected works
Bidrag til Nordens Historie i Middelalderen (1871) 
Den Nordiske Kirkes Grundlæggelse (1874-1878) 
40 Fortællinger af Fædrelandets Historie (1882; 1886) 
Udsigt over de danske Rigsarchivers Historie (1884) 
Georg Zoega (1881)  
Niels Stensen (1884) 
Johannes Ewald (1888)

References

External links 
 Adolf Ditlev Jørgensen on Project Runeberg
 

1840 births
1897 deaths
People from the Duchy of Schleswig
19th-century Danish historians
Danish archivists
Members of the Royal Danish Academy of Sciences and Letters
Commanders Second Class of the Order of the Dannebrog